Alsophila metteniana, synonym Cyathea metteniana, is a species of tree fern native to the Ryukyu Islands, Japan, and Taiwan, where it grows in wet forest, forest margins, and on hillsides. The trunk of this plant is erect, up to 1 m tall, and 6–10 cm in diameter. C. metteniana has tripinnate fronds that are 1–2.5 m long. The stipe is brown to purple-black in colouration. It is covered in long, broad-based scales that are usually bicoloured (glossy brown with a paler margin). Sori are round, lack indusia, and occur in two rows, one on either side of the pinnule midvein.

The specific epithet metteniana commemorates pteridologist Georg Heinrich Mettenius (1823-1866), who named several Cyathea species.

References

metteniana
Ferns of Asia
Flora of the Ryukyu Islands
Flora of Japan
Flora of Taiwan
Plants described in 1868